Cedar Mountain, also known as Slaughter Mountain, is a piedmont monadnock in Culpeper County, Virginia. The mountain was used as a signal mountain by confederate troops during the Civil War. Remnants of that fortification are still visible today.

Ridges of Virginia
Landforms of Culpeper County, Virginia
Journey Through Hallowed Ground National Heritage Area